is a Japanese sports equipment and athletic goods company with its international corporate headquarters located in Nishi-ku, Hiroshima, Chūgoku. Specializing in equipment for ball games, the balls manufactured by Mikasa for sports football, Korfball, basketball, volleyball, waterpolo and handball are often used for official matches, games and competitions.

Most notably, Mikasa volleyballs are the official balls for all Fédération Internationale de Volleyball (International Volleyball Federation) worldwide competitions, and numerous domestic leagues outside of North America. Mikasa volleyballs are the official ball for the Olympics. Presently clubs, regions, high schools, colleges, and tournaments throughout the U.S. use Mikasa volleyballs.

History
Mikasa was founded in 1917 as the Hiroshima Gomu Corporation. The company began its life producing many different types of rubber products, such as flip-flops and dodgeballs. It began using the Mikasa brand name on its sports products in 1935, and in the early 1940s was consolidated with a number of rival rubber companies. Following World War II, the company grew rapidly: Mikasa volleyballs made their Olympic debut at the 1964 Tokyo Olympics, and in the 1970s the company began to expand globally. Since 1980, Mikasa has also produced the official Olympic water polo ball.

In the 2000s, Mikasa was faced with allegations of labor violations in some factories in Thailand. The ITUC published a report alleging anti-labor campaigns by company management. The report detailed allegations of unethical labor practices such as the penalization of union leaders and labor organizers via discriminatory transfers and unjust disciplinary procedures. The ITUC argued that Mikasa succeeded in either forcing the resignation of most of the factory's union committee in an affront to the right of its employees to organize. The Thai Labor Campaign alleged that new Mikasa factory workers received only 173 baht per day. (equivalent to $4.36 per day in 2006)

Products 
Mikasa makes many different types of balls, including goods for basketball, beach and indoor volleyball, football, rugby union, waterpolo, korfball, American football and rugby football. (The last two are available solely in the United States)

Sponsorships
Mikasa has been the official ball provider for the following leagues and associations, in addition to having exclusive agreements with some prominent athletes:

Volleyball

Athletes 
 Misty May-Treanor
 Reid Priddy
 Marta Menegatti
 Sara Hughes

Clubs 
 HAOK Mladost
 C.S.M. Arcada Galati
 Dinamo Moscow

Federations 
 Fédération Internationale (FIVB)

National teams

Waterpolo 
 Ligue Européenne de Natation
 Fédération Internationale de Natation (men and women)
  Tony Azevedo
  National men and women teams

Gallery

See also

Asics
Molten
 Asian Games
 Universiade

Bibliography
 Michigan High School Athletic Association Bulletin, Volume 70, Michigan High School Athletic Association, 1993, University of Michigan, p. 464.
 Gay and lesbian tourism: the essential guide for marketing, Jeff Guaracino, p. 146.
 Sports sponsor factbook, Team Marketing Report, Inc., 1999, p. 623.
 Japanese multinationals, facts & figures, Tōyō Keizai Shinpōsha, 2007, p. 268.
 American Commercial Inc. d/b/a Mikasa and Mikasa Licensing, Inc. v. Sports and Leisure International d/b/a Mikasa Sports, Civil Action No. 96–713LHM (U.S.D.C. C.D. Cal.).

References

External links

 
 Mikasa USA

Sporting goods manufacturers of Japan
Companies based in Hiroshima
Manufacturing companies established in 1917
Japanese brands
Multinational companies headquartered in Japan
Rubber industry
Sporting goods brands
Sportswear brands
Japanese companies established in 1917